Marchant Davies (31 May 1896 – 22 February 1973) was a South African cricketer. He played in eleven first-class matches from 1913/14 to 1926/27.

References

External links
 

1896 births
1973 deaths
South African cricketers
Border cricketers
Eastern Province cricketers